Leïla Jaffel (Arabic ليلى جفال) (born 29 August 1960) is a Tunisian magistrate and politician serving as minister of justice in the Bouden Cabinet since 2021.

She was Minister of State Domains and Land Affairs in the Mechichi Cabinet.

References 

1960 births
Living people
21st-century Tunisian politicians
21st-century Tunisian women politicians
Female justice ministers
Independent politicians in Tunisia
Justice ministers of Tunisia
Tunisian women lawyers
Women government ministers of Tunisia